Razmik Amyan (born January 8, 1982) is an Armenian singer. In 2017, Amyan was awarded with the title of Honored Artist of Armenia upon the decree of the Armenian President Serzh Sargsyan. He was also named the singer of the year at the World Armenian Entertainment Awards in 2014 and at the Armenian Golden Star Awards in 2010. He performed in the Toronto A.C.C. Summerfest in 2017 alongside other notable Armenian singers.

He has released numerous music videos including "Yeraguyn" in March 2012, the animated "Musical Alphabet" in December 2007, "Pstik Papan" in August 2008, and "Karabakhe mern e" in May 2015.

Discography

Albums

Singles

As lead artist

Filmography

Awards and nominations

References

1982 births
Living people
21st-century Armenian male singers
Armenian pop singers
People from Stepanakert
Honored artists of Armenia